Acamptopappus shockleyi, or Shockley's goldenhead, is a perennial subshrub in the family Asteraceae found in and near the eastern Mojave desert in southern Nevada and southeastern California.

Description
Acamptopappus shockleyi is a perennial subshrub. Flower heads are borne singly, with both ray flowers and disk flowers, compared to Acamptopappus sphaerocephalus which also grows in the Mojave desert but has only disc flowers on heads in corymbose arrays.

Etymology
The species is named after William Hillman Shockley.

References

External links
Calflora Database: Acamptopappus shockleyi (Shockley's goldenhead)

Astereae
Flora of the California desert regions
Flora of Nevada
Natural history of the Mojave Desert
Plants described in 1882
Taxa named by Asa Gray
Flora without expected TNC conservation status